Hindu Samhati is a Far-right Hindu nationalist organisation founded on 14 February 2008 by Tapan Ghosh. The organisation's main aim was to protect Bengali Hindus. It has organisation in every district of West Bengal. It has opened newly units in Assam and Jharkhand. Its main slogan is "Jai Maa Kali" along with "Jai Shree Ram".

Etymolgy 
"Hindu Samhati" came from Bengali word meaning "Hindu solidarity". The main motive of the organisation was solidarity with Hindus, primarily with Bengalis.

History

Background 
The organisation was founded in February 2008 by Tapan Ghosh after he was separated from the Rashtriya Swayamsevak Sangh due to the ideological conflicts and the working the RSS. He and his followers formed to organisation for the Advocacy of Bengali Hindus.

Functioning 
Samhati has been an advocate on the persecution of Bengali Hindus and has worked for the protection and betterment of Bengali Hindus and had also made prominence in the eastern India, notably in West Bengal along with Assam and Jharkhand.

References

Hindu nationalism

External links 

 

Hindu organisations based in India
Hindutva
2008 establishments in West Bengal
Far-right politics in India
Hinduism and politics
Religious organizations established in 2008
Organisations based in West Bengal
Organisations based in Assam
Organisations based in Jharkhand
Anti-Christian sentiment in Asia
Anti-Islam sentiment in India